Otávio Della (born 22 June 1969) is a former professional tennis player from Brazil, now a tennis administrator.

Della played mostly on the Challenger circuit, but also made some appearances on the Grand Prix tennis circuit and ATP Tour. He twice participated in the Guarujá Open and in 1988 made it into the second round, with a win over Swede Ronnie Båthman. The Brazilian also played at the 1989 Citibank Open in Itaparica, where he was defeated in the opening round by Todd Witsken of the United States.

He had more success as a doubles player, winning five Challenger titles and making quarter-finals at Umag in 1990 and Bogota in 1994.

Challenger titles

Doubles: (5)

References

1969 births
Living people
Brazilian male tennis players
Tennis players from São Paulo
20th-century Brazilian people
21st-century Brazilian people